ARTARENA is an "art film museum" planned for Sunderland in northeast England. It is intended to show items from the Roland Collection of Films on Art on 45 screens; visitors will wander between them wearing headphones that switch to the appropriate soundtrack.

The original concept called for a futuristic €35m building in London. This gave way to a £2m reconstruction of the West Park United Reformed church on Stockton Road in Sunderland, which is planned to open in April 2012. Visitors will pay a small fee to get in and then rent headphones by the hour; over 160,000 are expected in the first year.

Concept
The term “artarena” is the contraction of two words, art and arena (meaning sand, from the original sand ground of arenas in Ancient Greece). The Art Arena is a large and opened gallery space, which has the specificity to present art films about classical and contemporary art forms and not physical artworks. The films presented are extracted from the Roland Collection, a collection of films and documentaries that have been collected over a 30 years period by Anthony Roland. The design of the Art Arena includes many projection alcoves that are playing simultaneously. With the use of geolocalized wireless headset technology, the visitors can move freely through the projection spaces and experience each film, by only hearing the projection which they are viewing. This device allows the removal of space dividers such as acoustical walls between the projection spaces.

History
The Art Arena concept of a cultural space was originally developed in 2002 by art film collector Anthony Roland and architect David Serero. The initial plan for an "Art Arena Roland Museum" was for a futuristic €35m complex in London combining exhibition space, film storage, and over forty projection spaces.

In 2010 the plan emerged to redevelop the Sunderland site. The church was built as a Congregational church in 1881-3, to a design by JP Pritchett. The URC put it up for sale in March 2010, at which time it was also being used by the West House Christian Fellowship, the Sunderland Filipino Church and the Mountain of Fire church.

Future
Discussions have already taken place on replicating the format in churches elsewhere in the UK. Roland is planning a much bigger establishment in London's Docklands, with 200 projection spaces.

References

External links
 Roland Collection - planning documents and budgets
 The Art Arena Charity

Cinemas in Tyne and Wear
Art museums and galleries in Tyne and Wear
Contemporary art galleries in England
Planned developments
Art museums established in 2012
2012 establishments in England
Proposed museums in the United Kingdom
Sunderland